Kristoffer Kristofferson (born June 22, 1936) is a retired American singer, songwriter and actor. Among his songwriting credits are "Me and Bobby McGee", "For the Good Times", "Sunday Mornin' Comin' Down", and "Help Me Make It Through the Night", all of which were hits for other artists.

In 1985, Kristofferson joined fellow country artists Waylon Jennings, Willie Nelson and Johnny Cash in the country music supergroup The Highwaymen, which was a key creative force in the outlaw country music movement that eschewed the traditional Nashville country music machine in favor of independent songwriting and producing.

As an actor, Kristofferson is known for his roles in Pat Garrett & Billy the Kid (1973), Blume in Love (1973), Alice Doesn't Live Here Anymore (1974), A Star Is Born (1976) (which earned him a Golden Globe Award for Best Actor), Convoy (1978), Heaven's Gate (1980), Lone Star (1996), Stagecoach (1986), and the Blade film trilogy (1998–2004).

In 2004, Kristofferson was inducted into the Country Music Hall of Fame.

Early life and education 
Kristoffer Kristofferson was born in Brownsville, Texas, to Mary Ann ( Ashbrook) and Lars Henry Kristofferson, a U.S. Army Air Corps officer (later a U.S. Air Force major general). His paternal grandparents emigrated from Sweden, while his mother had English, Scots-Irish, German, Swiss-German, and Dutch ancestry. Kristofferson's paternal grandfather was an officer in the Swedish Army. While Kristofferson was a child, his father pushed him toward a military career.

San Mateo, California 
Kristofferson moved around frequently as a youth because of his father's military service, and they settled in San Mateo, California. He graduated from San Mateo High School in 1954. An aspiring writer, Kristofferson immediately enrolled in Pomona College. His early writing included prize-winning essays, and "The Rock" and "Gone Are the Days" were published in The Atlantic Monthly. These early stories reveal the roots of Kristofferson's passions and concerns. "The Rock" is about a geographical feature resembling the form of a woman, while the latter was about a racial incident.

At the age of 17, Kristofferson took a summer job with a dredging contractor on Wake Island in the western Pacific Ocean. He called it "the hardest job I ever had".

Pomona College 
Kristofferson attended Pomona College and experienced his first national exposure in 1958, appearing in Sports Illustrated "Faces in the Crowd" on March 31 for his achievements in collegiate rugby union, American football, and track and field. He and his classmates revived the Claremont Colleges Rugby Club in 1958, and it remains a Southern California rugby institution. Kristofferson graduated in 1958 with a Bachelor of Arts degree, summa cum laude, in literature. He was elected to Phi Beta Kappa his junior year. In a 2004 interview with Pomona College Magazine, Kristofferson mentioned philosophy professor Frederick Sontag as an important influence in his life.

In 1973, Kristofferson received an honorary doctorate in fine arts from Pomona College during Alumni Weekend, accompanied by fellow performers Johnny Cash and Rita Coolidge. His award was presented to him by his aforementioned mentor, Professor Sontag.

Oxford University 
In 1958 Kristofferson won a Rhodes Scholarship to Oxford University, studying at Merton College. While at Oxford, he was awarded a Blue for boxing, played rugby for his college, and began writing songs. At Oxford, he became acquainted with fellow Rhodes scholar, art critic, and poet Michael Fried. With the help of his manager, Larry Parnes, Kristofferson recorded for Top Rank Records under the name Kris Carson. Parnes was working to sell Kristofferson as "a Yank at Oxford" to the British public; Kristofferson was willing to accept that promotional approach if it helped his singing career, which he hoped would enable him to progress toward his goal of becoming a novelist. This early phase of his music career was unsuccessful. In 1960, Kristofferson graduated with a B.Phil. degree in English literature. In 1961, he married his longtime girlfriend, Frances Mavia Beer.

Career

Military service 
Kristofferson, under pressure from his family, joined the U.S. Army, was commissioned as a second lieutenant and attained the rank of captain. He became a helicopter pilot after receiving flight training at Fort Rucker, Alabama. He also completed Ranger School. During the early 1960s, he was stationed in West Germany as a member of the 8th Infantry Division. During this time, he resumed his music career and formed a band. In 1965, after his tour in Germany ended, Kristofferson was given an assignment to teach English literature at West Point. Instead, he decided to leave the Army and pursue songwriting. His family disowned him because of his career decision; sources are unclear on whether they reconciled. They saw it as a rejection of everything they stood for, although Kristofferson says he is proud of his time in the military and received the Veteran of the Year Award at the 2003 American Veterans Awards ceremony.

Music 
After leaving the army in 1965, Kristofferson moved to Nashville. He worked odd jobs while struggling for success in music while burdened with medical expenses resulting from his son's defective esophagus. He and his wife soon divorced.

He got a job sweeping floors at Columbia Recording Studios in Nashville. He met June Carter there and asked her to give Johnny Cash a tape of his. She did, but Cash put it on a large pile with others. He also worked as a commercial helicopter pilot for south Louisiana firm Petroleum Helicopters International (PHI), based in Lafayette, Louisiana. Kristofferson recalled of his days as a pilot, "That was about the last three years before I started performing, before people started cutting my songs. I would work a week down here [in south Louisiana] for PHI, sitting on an oil platform and flying helicopters. Then I'd go back to Nashville at the end of the week and spend a week up there trying to pitch the songs, then come back down and write songs for another week. I can remember "Help Me Make It Through the Night" I wrote sitting on top of an oil platform. I wrote "Bobby McGee" down here, and a lot of them [in south Louisiana]."

Weeks after giving Carter his tapes, Kristofferson landed a helicopter in Cash's front yard, gaining his full attention. A story about Kristofferson having a beer in one hand and some songs in the other upon arrival was reputed, but has been disproven, with Kristofferson saying, "It was still kind of an invasion of privacy that I wouldn't recommend. To be honest, I don't think he was there. John had a pretty creative memory." But upon hearing "Sunday Mornin' Comin' Down", Cash decided to record it, and in 1970 Kristofferson won Songwriter of the Year for the song at the Country Music Association Awards.

In 1966, Dave Dudley released a successful Kristofferson single, "Viet Nam Blues." In 1967, Kristofferson signed to Epic Records and released a single, "Golden Idol/Killing Time," but the song was not successful. Within the next few years, more Kristofferson originals hit the charts, performed by Roy Drusky ("Jody and the Kid"); Billy Walker & the Tennessee Walkers ("From the Bottle to the Bottom"); Ray Stevens ("Sunday Mornin' Comin' Down"); Jerry Lee Lewis ("Once More with Feeling"); Faron Young ("Your Time's Comin'"); and Roger Miller ("Me and Bobby McGee", "Best of all Possible Worlds", and "Darby's Castle"). He was successful as a performer following Johnny Cash's introduction of him at the Newport Folk Festival.

Kristofferson signed with Monument Records as a recording artist. In addition to running that label, Fred Foster also served as manager of Combine Music, Kristofferson's songwriting label. His debut album for Monument in 1970 -- Kristofferson—included a few new songs as well as many of his previous hits. Sales were poor, although this debut album would become a success the following year after it was re-released under the title Me & Bobby McGee. Kristofferson's compositions were still in demand. Ray Price ("For the Good Times"), Gladys Knight & The Pips ("Help Me Make It Through The Night"), Waylon Jennings ("The Taker"), Bobby Bare ("Come Sundown"), Johnny Cash ("Sunday Morning Coming Down"), and Sammi Smith ("Help Me Make It Through the Night") all recorded successful versions of his songs in the early-1970s. "For the Good Times" (Ray Price) won "Song of the Year" in 1970 from the Academy of Country Music, while "Sunday Morning Coming Down" (Johnny Cash) won the same award from the academy's rival, the Country Music Association, in the same year. This is the only time an individual received the same award from these two organizations in the same year for different songs.

In 1971, Janis Joplin, who had dated Kristofferson, had a number one hit with "Me and Bobby McGee" from her posthumous album Pearl. It stayed on the number-one spot on the charts for weeks. More hits followed from others: Ray Price ("I'd Rather Be Sorry"); Joe Simon ("Help Me Make It Through the Night"); Bobby Bare ("Please Don't Tell Me How the Story Ends"); O.C. Smith ("Help Me Make It Through the Night"); Jerry Lee Lewis ("Me and Bobby McGee"); Patti Page ("I'd Rather Be Sorry"); and Peggy Little ("I've Got to Have You"). Country music performer Kenny Rogers recorded some of Kristofferson's compositions, including a version of "Me and Bobby McGee" in 1969 with The First Edition for the Ruby, Don't Take Your Love To Town album.

Kristofferson released his second album -- The Silver Tongued Devil and I—in 1971. It included "Lovin' Her Was Easier (Than Anything I'll Ever Do Again)". This success established Kristofferson's career as a recording artist. Soon after, Kristofferson made his acting debut in The Last Movie (directed by Dennis Hopper), and appeared at the Isle of Wight Festival. A portion of his Isle of Wight performance is featured on the three disc compilation, The First Great Rock Festivals of the Seventies. In 1971, he acted in Cisco Pike, and released his third album, Border Lord. The album was all-new material and sales were sluggish. He also swept the Grammy Awards that year with numerous songs nominated, winning country song of the year for "Help Me Make It Through the Night". Kristofferson's 1972 fourth album, Jesus Was a Capricorn, initially had slow sales, but the third single, "Why Me", was a success and significantly increased album sales. It sold over one million copies, and was awarded a gold disc by the RIAA on November 8, 1973.

In 1972, Kristofferson appeared with Rita Coolidge on British TV on BBC's The Old Grey Whistle Test, performing a physically intimate version of "Help Me Make It Through the Night". Also in 1972, Al Green released his version of "For the Good Times" on the album I'm Still in Love with You.

Film 

For the next several years, Kristofferson focused on acting. He appeared in Blume in Love (1973) directed by Paul Mazursky, and three Sam Peckinpah films: Pat Garrett and Billy the Kid (1973), Bring Me the Head of Alfredo Garcia (1974), and Convoy (1978) and Michael Ritchie's Semi-Tough (1977) with Burt Reynolds. He continued acting in Martin Scorsese's Alice Doesn't Live Here Anymore (1974), Vigilante Force (1976), and The Sailor Who Fell from Grace with the Sea (1976), the romantic drama A Star Is Born (1976) with Barbra Streisand, for which he received a Golden Globe Award for Best Actor soon followed. At the peak of his box office power, Kristofferson turned down William Friedkin's Sorcerer (1977) and the romantic war film Hanover Street (1979). Despite his success with Streisand, Kristofferson's solo musical career headed downward with his non-charting ninth album, Shake Hands with the Devil. His next film, the two-part 1979 NBC-TV movie Freedom Road, did not get good ratings.

Kristofferson was next cast in the lead role as the enigmatic Sheriff James Averill in Michael Cimino's bleak and sprawling 1980 anti-Western Heaven's Gate. Despite being a scandalous studio-bankrupting and industry-changing failure at the time (it cost Kristofferson his Hollywood A-list status), the film gained critical recognition in subsequent years. In 1986, he starred in The Last Days of Frank and Jesse James with Johnny Cash and Flashpoint in 1984, directed by William Tannen. This was followed, in 1985, by the neo-noir thriller Trouble In Mind co-starring Keith Carradine and Lori Singer. In 1987, Kristofferson starred in the seven-episode TV series Amerika with Robert Urich and Christine Lahti. In 1989, he was the male lead in the film Millennium with Cheryl Ladd. In 1996, he earned a supporting role as Charlie Wade, a corrupt South Texas sheriff in John Sayles's Lone Star, a film nominated for an Oscar for Best Screenplay. In 1997, he co-starred in the film Fire Down Below with Steven Seagal.

In 1998, he took a role in the film Blade, alongside Wesley Snipes, as Blade's mentor Abraham Whistler. He reprised the role in Blade II (2002) and again in Blade: Trinity (2004). In 1998 he starred in Dance with Me along with Vanessa Williams and Chayanne. In 1999, he co-starred with Mel Gibson in Payback. He was then in the 2001 Tim Burton version of Planet of the Apes. He has also played the title character "Yohan" as an old man in the Norwegian film Yohan—the Children Wanderer.  He co-starred in the 2011 film Dolphin Tale and its 2014 sequel, Dolphin Tale 2. In 2012, Kristofferson was in Joyful Noise with longtime friend Dolly Parton. In 2013, Kristofferson co-starred in The Motel Life, as well as Angels Sing with Willie Nelson and Lyle Lovett. In 2006, Kristofferson starred with Geneviève Bujold in the film Disappearances about whiskey running from Quebec to the US during the Great Depression.

Mid-career 
After his singing success in the early 1970s, Kristofferson met singer Rita Coolidge. They married in 1973 and released an album titled Full Moon, another success buoyed by numerous hit singles and Grammy nominations. However, his fifth album, Spooky Lady's Sideshow, released in 1974, was a commercial failure, setting the trend for most of the rest of his musical career. Artists such as Ronnie Milsap and Johnny Duncan continued to record Kristofferson's material with success, but his distinctively rough voice and anti-pop sound kept his own audience to a minimum. Meanwhile, more artists took his songs to the top of the charts, including Willie Nelson, whose 1979 LP release of (Willie Nelson) Sings Kristofferson reached number five on the U.S. Country Music chart and certified Platinum in the U.S.

In 1979, Kristofferson traveled to Havana, Cuba, to participate in the historic Havana Jam festival that took place on March 2–4, alongside Rita Coolidge, Stephen Stills, the CBS Jazz All-Stars, the Trio of Doom, Fania All-Stars, Billy Swan, Bonnie Bramlett, Mike Finnegan, Weather Report, and Billy Joel, plus an array of Cuban artists such as Irakere, Pacho Alonso, Tata Güines, and Orquesta Aragón. His performance is captured on Ernesto Juan Castellanos's documentary Havana Jam '79.

On November 18, 1979, Kristofferson and Coolidge appeared on The Muppet Show, where Kristofferson sang "Help Me Make It Through the Night" with Miss Piggy, Coolidge sang "We're All Alone" with forest animals, and the pair sang "Song I'd Like to Sing" with the Muppet monsters. They divorced in 1980.

Later work
In 1982, Kristofferson joined Willie Nelson, Dolly Parton and Brenda Lee on The Winning Hand, a double album consisting of remastered and updated performances of recordings the four artists had made for the Monument label during the mid-1960s; the album reached the top ten on the U.S. country album charts. He married again, to Lisa Meyers, and concentrated on films for a time, appearing in the 1984 releases The Lost Honor of Kathryn Beck, Flashpoint and Songwriter. Nelson and Kristofferson both appeared in Songwriter, and Kristofferson was nominated for an Academy Award for Best Original Song Score. The album Music from Songwriter, featuring Nelson-Kristofferson duets, was a massive country success.

Nelson and Kristofferson continued their partnership, and added Waylon Jennings and Johnny Cash to form the supergroup The Highwaymen. Their first album, Highwayman, was a success, and the supergroup continued working together for a time. The single from the album, also entitled "Highwayman", written by Jimmy Webb (and originally recorded by him in 1977), was awarded the ACM's single of the year in 1985. In 1985, Kristofferson starred in Trouble in Mind and released Repossessed, a politically aware album that was a country success, particularly "They Killed Him" (also performed by Bob Dylan), a tribute to his heroes, including Martin Luther King Jr., Jesus, and Mahatma Gandhi. Kristofferson also appeared in Amerika at about the same time, a miniseries that attempted to depict life in America under Soviet control.

In spite of the success of Highwayman 2 in 1990, Kristofferson's solo recording career slipped significantly in the early 1990s, though he continued to record successfully with the Highwaymen. Lone Star (1996 film by John Sayles) reinvigorated Kristofferson's acting career, and he soon appeared in Blade, Blade II, Blade: Trinity, A Soldier's Daughter Never Cries, Fire Down Below, Tim Burton's remake of Planet of the Apes, Chelsea Walls, Payback, The Jacket, and Fast Food Nation.

The Songwriters Hall of Fame inducted Kristofferson in 1985, as had the Nashville Songwriters Hall of Fame earlier, in 1977. In 1999, The Austin Sessions, was released, an album on which Kristofferson reworked some of his favorite songs with the help of artists such as Mark Knopfler, Steve Earle, and Jackson Browne. In 2003, Broken Freedom Song was released, a live album recorded in San Francisco.

In 2003, he received the "Spirit of Americana" free speech award from The Americana Music Association. In 2004, he was inducted into the Country Music Hall of Fame. In 2006, he received the Johnny Mercer Award from the Songwriters Hall of Fame and released his first album full of new material in 11 years; This Old Road. On April 21, 2007, Kristofferson won CMT's Johnny Cash Visionary Award. Rosanne Cash, Cash's daughter, presented the honor during the April 16 awards show in Nashville. Previous recipients include Cash, Hank Williams, Jr., Loretta Lynn, Reba McEntire, and the Dixie Chicks. "John was my hero before he was my friend, and anything with his name on it is really an honor in my eyes," Kristofferson said during a phone interview. "I was thinking back to when I first met him, and if I ever thought that I'd be getting an award with his name on it, it would have carried me through a lot of hard times."

In July 2007, Kristofferson was featured on CMT's Studio 330 Sessions where he played many of his hits.

On June 13, 2008, Kristofferson performed an acoustic in-the-round set with Patty Griffin and Randy Owen (Alabama) for a special taping of a PBS songwriters series aired in December. Each performer played five songs. Kristofferson's set included "The Best of All Possible Worlds", "Darby's Castle", "Casey's Last Ride", "Me and Bobby McGee", and "Here Comes that Rainbow Again". Taping was done in Nashville.

Kristofferson released a new album of original songs entitled Closer to the Bone on September 29, 2009. It is produced by Don Was on the New West label. Prior to the release, Kristofferson remarked: "I like the intimacy of the new album. It has a general mood of reflecting on where we all are at this time of life."

On November 10, 2009, Kristofferson was honored as a BMI Icon at the 57th annual BMI Country Awards. Throughout his career, Kristofferson's songwriting has garnered 48 BMI Country and Pop Awards. He later remarked, "The great thing about being a songwriter is you can hear your baby interpreted by so many people that have creative talents vocally that I don't have." Kristofferson had always denied having a good voice, and has said that as he has aged, what quality it might once have had had begun to decay.

In December 2009, it was announced that Kristofferson would be portraying Joe on the upcoming album Ghost Brothers of Darkland County, a collaboration between rock singer John Mellencamp and novelist Stephen King.

On May 11, 2010, Light in the Attic Records released demos that were recorded during Kristofferson's janitorial stint at Columbia. Please Don't Tell Me How the Story Ends: The Publishing Demos is the first time these recordings have been released and includes material that would later be featured on other Kristofferson recordings and on the recordings of other prominent artists, such as the original recording of "Me and Bobby McGee".

On June 4, 2011, Kristofferson performed a solo acoustic show at the Maui Arts and Cultural Center, showcasing both some of his original hits made famous by other artists, and newer songs.

In early 2013, Kristofferson released a new album of original songs called Feeling Mortal. A live album titled An Evening With Kris Kristofferson was released in September 2014.

Kristofferson voiced the character Chief Hanlon of the NCR Rangers in the hit 2010 video game Fallout: New Vegas.

In an interview for Las Vegas magazine Q&A by Matt Kelemen on October 23, 2015, he revealed that a new album, The Cedar Creek Sessions, recorded in Austin, would include some old and some new songs. In December 2016, the album was nominated for a Grammy Award for Best Americana Album.

Kristofferson covered Brandi Carlile's "Turpentine" on the 2017 album Cover Stories.

Kristofferson performed, with assistance from Carlile, the Joni Mitchell composition "A Case of You", from the 1971 Mitchell album Blue, on November 7, 2018, at the Both Sides Now - Joni 75 A Birthday Celebration to celebrate the 75th birthday of Mitchell.

In June 2019, Kristofferson was announced as being one of the supporting artists for a Barbra Streisand "exclusive European concert" on July 7 in London's Hyde Park as part of the Barclay's Summertime Concert series.

In January 2021, it was announced that Kristofferson had retired. His final performances were widely reported to be on the Outlaw Country Cruise in January 2020 but this is inaccurate. Kris Kristofferson's last full performance was at the Sunrise Theatre in Fort Pierce, Florida, on February 5, 2020. Like the Outlaw Country Cruise, he was backed by the Strangers.

Personal life 
In 1961, he married his longtime girlfriend, Frances "Fran" Mavia Beer, eventually divorcing. Kristofferson briefly dated Janis Joplin before her death in October 1970. His second marriage was to singer Rita Coolidge in 1973, ending in divorce by 1980. Kristofferson married Lisa Meyers in 1983.

Kristofferson and Lisa Meyers Kristofferson own a home in Los Flores Canyon in Malibu, California, and maintain a residence in Hana on the island of Maui. Kristofferson has encountered a few serious medical issues in the past few decades. He had successful bypass surgery in 1999, but from 2004 to 2015 suffered from what was finally diagnosed as Lyme disease, although it was initially and incorrectly thought to be early-stage Alzheimer's disease. It is unclear how Kristofferson contracted Lyme disease, but it is suspected that he caught it while filming a movie in the woods of Vermont in 2002. His wife credits the successful diagnosis and recovery to getting second opinions when dealing with auto-immune and Alzheimer-type diagnoses. Kristofferson is currently being treated by a specialist in California "who added antibiotic intramuscular injections to Kris's protocol and is continuing to treat Kris", his wife reported.

Kristofferson has eight children from his three marriages and one child from his time in Germany as a helicopter pilot: from his first marriage to Fran Beer, daughter Tracy (b. 1962) and son Kris (b. 1968); from his second marriage, to Rita Coolidge, daughter Casey (b. 1974); and from his marriage to his current wife, Lisa (Meyers) Kristofferson, Jesse (b. 1983), Jody (b. 1985), Johnny (b. 1988), Kelly Marie (b. 1990), and Blake (b. 1994).

Kristofferson has said that he would like the first three lines of Leonard Cohen's "Bird on the Wire" on his tombstone:
Like a bird on the wire
Like a drunk in a midnight choir
I have tried in my way to be free

Awards and nominations

Grammy Awards 
Kristofferson has won three competitive Grammys from thirteen nominations. He received the Lifetime Achievement Award in 2014.

Discography

Filmography

References

Further reading
 Bernhardt, Jack. (1998). "Kris Kristofferson". In The Encyclopedia of Country Music. Paul Kingsbury, Editor. New York: Oxford University Press. pp. 286–7.

External links

 
  Kristofferson Fan Website
 The Old Oxonion Blues 1959 profile in Time
 Kristofferson at the Country Music Hall of Fame
 Kris Kristofferson at New West Records
 
 
 
 
 
 Kris Kristofferson at Broadcast Music, Inc.

1936 births
20th-century American guitarists
20th-century American male actors
20th-century American male musicians
21st-century American male actors
Alumni of Merton College, Oxford
American acoustic guitarists
American aviators
American country guitarists
American country singer-songwriters
American folk guitarists
American male film actors
American male guitarists
American male singer-songwriters
American people of Dutch descent
American people of English descent
American people of Scotch-Irish descent
American people of Swedish descent
American people of Swiss-German descent
American Rhodes Scholars
American rock guitarists
Best Musical or Comedy Actor Golden Globe (film) winners
Columbia Records artists
Country Music Hall of Fame inductees
Country musicians from Texas
Grammy Lifetime Achievement Award winners
Guitarists from Texas
Living people
Male actors from Texas
Members of the Country Music Association
Mercury Records artists
Monument Records artists
New West Records artists
Outlaw country singers
People from Brownsville, Texas
Pomona College alumni
Pomona-Pitzer Sagehens football players
Singer-songwriters from Texas
Texas Democrats
The Highwaymen (country supergroup) members
United States Army aviators
United States Army officers
Warner Records artists
Military personnel from Texas
Blues rock musicians
Light In The Attic Records artists